The Rocky Mountain Raptor Program is a 501(c)(3) non-profit wildlife conservation organization based in Fort Collins, Colorado that rescues, rehabilitates and releases injured birds of prey—including eagles, hawks, falcons and owls—and, through its comprehensive Environmental Education program, teaches the importance of preserving wildlife and wild places for future generations. RMRP has developed a national reputation for the treatment of raptor illness and injuries, cage design, volunteer management, community involvement, and youth development. Raptor patients receive fracture repair, wound care, fluids to combat dehydration, nutritious food, and regular medical attention to promote healing. Raptors that are permanently injured and therefore non-releasable may become an Educational Ambassador. These raptors are the cornerstone of our Environmental Education program, which makes more than 200 presentations each year throughout the region, teaching children and adults about the importance of protecting wildlife and wild places. The program's environmental education program, particularly in the K-12 sector, has developed an excellent reputation throughout Colorado. RMRP reaches more than 15,000 schoolchildren annually. Numerous outreach exhibits throughout the state reach hundreds of thousands of people annually. Rocky Mountain Raptor Program currently averages about one admission and several injured raptor calls each day, and 77% of treatable raptors are released.

History
The Rocky Mountain Raptor Program started in 1979 as a student club at Colorado State University, rehabilitating a few injured raptors each year. From the first hawk cared for that year, thousands of raptors have followed. In 2007, to make room for CSU's Veterinary Hospital expansion, RMRP moved into a temporary facility at 720B East Vine Drive in Fort Collins. In the next several years, the program plans to create the Rocky Mountain Raptor Center for Avian Conservation, Education, and Research, a  raptor rehabilitation hospital, flight reconditioning center, and public wildlife experience, open to the public.

Facilities
Rocky Mountain Raptor Program currently operates at one facility in North Fort Collins. The raptor rehabilitation center and hospital is located at 720B East Vine Drive in Fort Collins Colorado. Although this facility is not open to the public, tours are available for a small fee.

References 

Rocky Mountain Raptor Program

Colorado Secretary of State 501c3 Nonprofit Verification for Rocky Mountain Raptor Program

Colorado Department of Revenue Nonprofit Registration Verification for Rocky Mountain Raptor Program

External links 
 Rocky Mountain Raptor Program
Colorado Gives-Rocky Mountain Raptor Program
Colorado Nonprofit Association-Rocky Mountain Raptor Program

Wildlife rehabilitation and conservation centers
Fauna of the Rocky Mountains
501(c)(3) organizations
Organizations based in Fort Collins, Colorado
Colorado State University
Buildings and structures in Larimer County, Colorado
Education in Larimer County, Colorado
Environmental organizations based in Colorado
Ornithological organizations in the United States